"Love Lost" is the fourth single from the Australian indie rock band The Temper Trap from their debut album Conditions. The single reached number 32 on the Australian Singles Chart on 12 April 2010.

The song was featured in the romantic comedy "No Strings Attached."

Track listing 
Download
 "Love Lost" - 3:35
 "Love Lost" (Rollo & Sister Bliss mix) - 7:04

Chart performance

References

2010 singles
2010 songs
The Temper Trap songs
Song recordings produced by Jim Abbiss
Infectious Records singles
Glassnote Records singles